Picard is a former settlement in Siskiyou County, California. It was at an elevation of 1300 m; all that remains is the cemetery.

Famous people
 Frank C. High, American soldier, recipient of the Medal of Honor (1875 – 1966)

References

Populated places in Siskiyou County, California
Former populated places in California